Shreya Ghoshal (born 12 March 1984) is an Indian playback singer. She sings in Hindi, Tamil, Telugu, Malayalam, Kannada, Marathi, Gujarati, Bengali, Assamese, Nepali, Oriya, Bhojpuri, Punjabi and Tulu languages. She sang more than 81 songs in Bhojpuri.

Here is the list of songs recorded by Shreya Ghoshal in the Bhojpuri language :-

List of Bhojpuri film songs 
She sang more than 81 songs in Bhojpuri .

2003

2004

2005

2006

2007

2008

2010

2011

2012

2013

2017 
2017 And 2018

See also
 List of songs recorded by Shreya Ghoshal

Bhojpuri
Ghoshal, Shreya
Ghoshal, Shreya